Jane Freedman (born 21 September 1968 in London) is a British–French sociologist and international relations scholar. She is known for her research on issues relating to gender, violence, conflict and migration, including sexual and gender-based violence in armed conflicts and against migrants and refugees. Her research has focused e.g. on violence in the Democratic Republic of the Congo and the refugees of the Syrian Civil War. She "examines women's experiences of forced migration, the insecurities they face and the obstacles that exist to providing full protection of women."

She held the Marie Curie Chair of Politics and International Relations at the Pantheon-Sorbonne University from 2006 to 2009 and then became Professor of Politics at the Paris 8 University. She is affiliated with the Centre de recherches sociologiques et politiques de Paris, a joint centre of the CNRS and the Paris 8 University. She has also served as an expert to several United Nations agencies.

Career
She earned a BA in Philosophy, Politics and Economics at the University of Oxford in 1990, an MSc in Political Theory at the London School of Economics in 1991, a DEA in political science at Sciences Po in 1992 and a doctorate in sociology at the Paris Diderot University in 1996.

She was a lecturer in French politics at the Department of European Studies at King's College London 1996–1998 and then joined the University of Southampton as a lecturer, senior lecturer and eventually as a reader in politics and international relations. She held the Marie Curie Chair of Politics and International Relations at the Pantheon-Sorbonne University from 2006 to 2009 and then became Professor of Politics at the Paris 8 University. She is also affiliated with the Centre de Recherches Sociologiques et Politiques de Paris at CNRS.

She has served as an expert to UNESCO, the United Nations High Commissioner for Refugees and the European Commission on gender, peace and security, prevention of violence against women, women asylum and migration, and women's political participation. In 2016 she was the inaugural distinguished visiting scholar at the Mary Robinson Centre, Ireland's first presidential centre and library.

In response to Brexit, Freedman said she intends to apply for French citizenship and that "it is horrible what is happening to my country."

Scholarly work
Freedman's research has focused on gender and international politics, international migration, refugees and asylum, gender-based violence and armed conflict. She has carried out research for example on gender-based violence in African countries, such as the Democratic Republic of the Congo. She has also carried out extensive research on immigration to Europe, including the European migrant crisis.

Bibliography
A Gendered Approach to the Syrian Refugee Crisis (ed. with Z. Kivilcim and N. Ozgur), Routledge, 2016
Gendering the International Asylum and Refugee Debate (2nd ed.), Palgrave Macmillan, 2015
Gender, Violence and Politics in the Democratic Republic of the Congo, Routledge, 2015
Engaging Men in the Fight against Gender-Based Violence: Case Studies from Africa (ed.), Palgrave Macmillan, 2012
Gendering the International Asylum and Refugee Debate, Palgrave Macmillan, 2007
Femmes, Genre, Migrations et Mondialisation: Un état des problématiques (ed. with J. Falquet, A. Rabaud and F. Scrinzi), Cedref, 2007
Persécutions des femmes: savoirs, mobilisations et protections (ed. with J. Valluy), Editions du Croquant, 2007
Immigration and Insecurity in France, Ashgate, 2004
Gender and Insecurity: Migrant Women in Europe (ed), Ashgate, 2003
Feminism, Open University Press, 2001
Women, Immigration and Identities in France (ed. with C. Tarr), Berg, 2000
Femmes politiques: mythes et symboles, L'Harmattan, 1997

References 

1968 births
Living people
British sociologists
British political scientists
French sociologists
French political scientists
International relations scholars
Gender studies academics
Academics of King's College London
Academics of the University of Southampton
Academic staff of Paris 8 University Vincennes-Saint-Denis
Academic staff of Pantheon-Sorbonne University
Alumni of the University of Oxford
Alumni of the London School of Economics
Sciences Po alumni
Women political scientists
British women sociologists
French women sociologists
People educated at the City of London School for Girls